"Motive" is a song by American singers Ariana Grande and Doja Cat. The two wrote the song with Victoria Monét, Nija Charles, Jeremy McIntyre, Steven Franks and its producers Murda Beatz and Tommy Brown. It was released by Republic Records on October 30, 2020, as the third track on the former's sixth studio album Positions.

Background
Grande first teased the collaboration with Doja Cat in an interview dated May 13, 2020. She said that they started to work on the song, which was titled "Motivate" at the time, towards the end of 2019. Grande recalled: "I remember when I first wrote it and sent it to her, she was in the shower and she was like, 'Girl, I love this. I'm in the shower.' And I was like, 'Shower. Okay, there's no rush. I'm not putting out a project anytime soon, whatever. You can call me later.' She was like, 'I'm doing it right now." Doja Cat video called her the next morning.

Grande praised Doja Cat's personality, calling her "a breath of fresh air". She also expressed her appreciation for her talent and "what she brings to the table musically", adding: "I was able to work with her earlier this year on this song that I want to save for whenever it's time again, to drop."

"Motive" was revealed on October 24, 2020, when Grande posted the track list of Positions on social media. It marks the first collaboration between Grande and Doja Cat, and the first time either artists had worked with Canadian hip hop producer Murda Beatz.

Composition
"Motive" is an upbeat dance-pop, electro house, and microhouse song. Its dance-pop sound has been compared to Grande's 2015 single "One Last Time". It samples a muffled disco bounce, while Doja Cat's verse is layered over Southern California hip hop beats. Lyrically, the song is about figuring out and examining the motive of a possible romantic interest when being approached by them. Alexis Petridis of The Guardian wrote that the song contains "house rhythms and soupy electronics".

Critical reception
"Motive" was positioned at number four on Billboards Jason Lipshutz's ranking of all 14 songs on Positions. He wrote that the song helped the album to "pick up the tempo", and that "the thump of the production guides the song forward". He called Doja Cat's feature on the song "radio-ready", and expected it to be "a top 40 staple in the near future". Brenton Blanchet of Clash found the "yuh" at the start of Doja Cat's verse "tasteful". Hannah Mylrea of NME wrote that "the bouncing electro-house of 'Motive' is a sweet treat". Kate Solomon of The Daily Telegraph identified the song as "one of the album's highlights", regarding it as "a made-for-radio hit" and calling it "one of the few tracks on the album to raise the tempo from a sleepy post-coital snuggle". David Smyth of the Evening Standard praised Grande's voice, and pointed out "how lightly [her] vocals float" when contrasted against Doja Cat's rap verse. Erica Gonzales of Harper's Bazaar described the song as "catchy as hell", writing: "The track is also perfectly upbeat and apropos for our virtual dance floors (a.k.a. our kitchens and bedrooms)." Alexa Camp of Slant Magazine considered the song "a welcome change of pace", given the scarcity of uptempo tracks on Grande's previous album, Thank U, Next.

Shaad D'Souza of The Fader deemed the track "the album's most dynamic moment", which he believed boasts the most significant tempo change and the strongest hook besides lead single "Positions". However, he felt "Grande jumping on a house-inflected beat" was "cheap", writing that it seemed "out-of-character" for Grande to hop on pop music trends.

Dani Blum of Pitchfork opined that the song might have been "an internet-breaking banger" if it was written in any other year, describing it as "twinkling and hushed". Bobby Olivier of Spin felt the song was a "well-sung throwaway that contribute nothing to [Grande's] catalog", while Adam White of The Independent called it a disappointment. Writing for Consequence of Sound, Mary Siroky classified "Motive" into "the bad" of the album, writing that "the pulsing duet ultimately falls flat".

Year-end lists
Alim Kheraj of The Guardian placed "Motive" at number 19 on his list of favorite tracks of 2020.

Credits and personnel
Credits adapted from Tidal and the liner notes of Positions.

Personnel

 Ariana Grande – vocals, background vocals, vocal production, vocal arrangement, audio engineering
 Murda Beatz – production
 Tommy Brown – production
 Mr. Franks – co-production
 Joseph L'Étranger – co-production
 Billy Hickey – audio engineering, mix engineering
 Randy Merrill – mastering
 Serban Ghenea – mixing

Recording and management
 Recorded at Grande's house (Los Angeles, California)
 Mixed at MixStar Studios (Virginia Beach, Virginia)
 Mastered at Sterling Sound (New York, New York)

Notes
 Physical releases of Positions credit Doja Cat as a featured artist.
 Physical releases of Positions credit Grande, Doja Cat, Monét and Charles for "lyrics and melodies".

Charts

Certifications

References

External links
 

2020 songs
Ariana Grande songs
Doja Cat songs
Songs written by Ariana Grande
Songs written by Doja Cat
Songs written by Murda Beatz
Songs written by Nija Charles
Songs written by Victoria Monét
Songs written by Tommy Brown (record producer)
Song recordings produced by Tommy Brown (record producer)
Song recordings produced by Murda Beatz
American dance-pop songs
Electro house songs